ATS Automation Tooling Systems is a Canadian company based in Cambridge, Ontario, that designs and builds factory automation systems. It is listed on the Toronto Stock Exchange.

History 
ATS was founded by Klaus Woerner in 1978.  Woerner, who immigrated to Canada from Germany in 1974, ran the company until his death in 2005, overseeing significant growth.  In 2007, ATS pulled the planned IPO of its solar division, Photowatt.  Partially as a result of this, two hedge funds, Goodwood and Mason Capital Management, led a proxy fight against the firm, leading to the a new board of directors and management team.  Anthony Caputo became CEO at this time.  Photowatt under-performed significantly in the years that followed; the company eventually sold Photowatt's French operations to EDF Group.

In 2011, ATS purchased Sortimat Group, a German life sciences automation firm, for $62 million.  In 2013, they purchased German packaging firm IWK for $144 million, and in 2014, they purchased the automation business of German company M+W Group for $362 million.

In February 2017, Andrew Hider was appointed CEO of the company.

Operations 
ATS builds automation systems for the medical devices, pharmaceuticals, telecommunications, semiconductor, fiber optics, automotive, computers, solar energy and consumer products industries. As of 2018, they have designed and built 23,000 automation systems.

ATS employs approximately 4200 people worldwide, with 20 facilities in North America, Europe and Asia.

References

External links 
 

Companies listed on the Toronto Stock Exchange
Manufacturing companies based in Ontario
Manufacturing companies of Canada
Companies based in Cambridge, Ontario
Equipment semiconductor companies
MES software